Loch Benachally is a large shallow freshwater reservoir that is located close to the Forest of Clunie in Perth and Kinross, Scotland.

The reservoir is operated by Scottish Water.

Iron Age villages
Some huts have stone enclosures. The field system of the Iron Age settlement has been visibly preserved down the ages and is marked with the remains of lynchets, walls and heaps of cleared stone. As the huts are in a straight line, they resemble a street. The conspicuousness of the "street" is enhanced by a wall which runs parallel to the row of houses,  to the south.

To the east-north-east of the Loch Benachally directly from the dam at the very south of the loch, is another Iron Age hut circle settlement and field system. Here as well, the field system is easily recognisable. The hut circle settlement follows a north-west to south-east orientation and is a larger settlement with 12 hut circles. There are two fields—a large field to the north and west of the hut circle group, and a small field to the south.

References

Benachally
Benachally
Tay catchment
Birdwatching sites in Scotland